James Lawrence Getz (September 14, 1821 – December 25, 1891) was an American newspaperman and politician who served three terms as a Democratic member of the U.S. House of Representatives from Pennsylvania from 1867 to 1873.

Biography
James L. Getz was born in Reading, Pennsylvania.  He pursued an academic course, and was one of the founders of the Reading Gazette in 1840.

He purchased the Jeffersonian Democrat and merged the two papers under the name of the Reading Gazette and Democrat, disposing of his interests in 1868.  He studied law and was admitted to the bar in 1846 but never practiced.

Political career
He was a member of the Pennsylvania State House of Representatives in 1856 and 1857 and served as Speaker of the House during the latter year.

Getz was elected as a Democrat to the Fortieth, Forty-first, and Forty-second Congresses.  He was not a candidate for renomination in 1872.

Later career and death
After leaving Congress, he again engaged in the newspaper business.  He served as city comptroller of Reading from 1888 until his death there in 1891.

He is interred in Reading's Charles Evans Cemetery.

Sources

The Political Graveyard

1821 births
1891 deaths
19th-century American newspaper publishers (people)
Burials at Charles Evans Cemetery
Democratic Party members of the Pennsylvania House of Representatives
Speakers of the Pennsylvania House of Representatives
American newspaper founders
Democratic Party members of the United States House of Representatives from Pennsylvania
19th-century American journalists
Politicians from Reading, Pennsylvania
American male journalists
19th-century American male writers
19th-century American politicians
Journalists from Pennsylvania